In molecular biology, glycoside hydrolase family 59 is a family of glycoside hydrolases.

Glycoside hydrolases  are a widespread group of enzymes that hydrolyse the glycosidic bond between two or more carbohydrates, or between a carbohydrate and a non-carbohydrate moiety. A classification system for glycoside hydrolases, based on sequence similarity, has led to the definition of >100 different families. This classification is available on the CAZy web site, and also discussed at CAZypedia, an online encyclopedia of carbohydrate active enzymes.

Glycoside hydrolase family 59 CAZY GH_59 comprises enzymes with only one known activity; galactocerebrosidase. Globoid cell leukodystrophy (Krabbe disease) is a severe, autosomal recessive disorder that results from deficiency of galactocerebrosidase (GALC) activity. GALC is responsible for the lysosomal catabolism of certain galactolipids, including galactosylceramide and psychosine.

References

EC 3.2.1
GH family
Protein families